Bruno Ramón Silva Barone (born 29 March 1980) is a Uruguayan former professional footballer who played as a right back.

During his career, he played for Danubio in Uruguay, FC Rostov in Russia, Groningen and Ajax in the Netherlands, as well as Internacional in Brazil, with whom he won the 2010 Copa Libertadores. A severe shoulder injury forced Silva into early retirement.

Club career

Early years
Silva began playing first-team football for Danubio in Montevideo, Uruguay at the start of the 2000 season. He remained with the club until 2003, then was transferred to FC Rostov to play in the Russian Premier League. He would make only four league appearances for the Russian side, before returning to Danubio back in his native Uruguay after the season ended. In the second half of the 2004 season, Silva played nine games in which he scored once. In 2005 he made fourteen appearances, in which he scored three goals. In total, Silva's return lasted a season and a half.

Groningen
Silva left for Europe again ahead of the 2005–06 season to sign a one-year contract with Dutch Eredivisie club Groningen. An emerging right full-back, he made a good impression with the Pride of the North, which resulted in his contract being extended. In the 2006–07 season Silva became a key player for the club. In the following season, Silva was again an important starter. During the winter transfer period of that season, there were several clubs that showed interest in the Uruguayan. Silva played 68 games in which he scored twice, as Groningen were in third place when he left in January 2008.

Ajax

First spell
In January 2008, Ajax showed interest in Silva. As a result, Silva decided to go on strike, in order to force a transfer. Eventually, he succeeded and moved to Ajax on 22 January 2008. This caused anger with the Groningen supporters. Groningen-teammates Rasmus Lindgren and Silva's fellow countryman Luis Suárez also leaving Groningen for Ajax added insult to injury. The first time Silva play an away game against Groningen with Ajax, burning toilet paper was thrown at the pitch, and the game was suspended due to fire on the stands. In the second half of the 2007–08 season, Silva made twelve appearances for Ajax.

The following season – 2008–09 – was a difficult season for Silva, as he was surpassed in the starting lineup by the emerging talent Gregory van der Wiel, which meant that he lost his starting job and was often not even part of the matchday squad. In the end, he would still play nine games and score once. In January 2009, both Palermo and Roma showed interest in acquiring Silva from Ajax. However, Ajax did not respond to this, because they at the time had too few defenders in the squad. During the first half of the 2009–10 season, Silva no longer made an impact on the pitch for Ajax.

Internacional (loan)
In December 2009, Brazilian club Internacional signed Silva on a one-year loan deal effective for the 2010 season. The loan was a success, with Silva helping the club win its second South American Copa Libertadores –  Silva's first international club accolade of his career. He made 15 appearances for the club, in which he scored one goal before returning to Ajax.

Return
Silva's loan ended on 31 December 2010. On 4 January 2011, he returned to the training pitch at Ajax, together with Argentine striker Darío Cvitanich, who had also been on loan during the 2010 season. Silva played in Ajax's winter friendlies under new head coach Frank de Boer, but on 11 January, he was injured during a training session and broke his collarbone. Because of this, Silva had to undergo surgery on his shoulder. On 3 February 2011, it was announced that Silva would be sidelined for about four months and therefore had to miss the rest of the season. However, something went wrong during surgery, and he suffered a life-threatening infection. He was sidelined for the entire 2011–12 season. On 31 March 2012 it was announced that Ajax would enter into talks with Silva about his expiring contract and rehabilitation.

Cerro Largo
After a long rehabilitation with multiple surgeries, Silva made his return in March 2013 as a player of Cerro Largo from his hometown. In 2014, he became team captain of the club, which suffered relegation from the Primera División to Segunda División that year. He retired after the 2017 season.

International career
On 4 February 2003, Silva made his debut for the Uruguay national team as part of the starting eleven in the Carlsberg Cup in the game against Iran under national coach Gustavo Ferrín. He was also called up for the national side under coach Juan Ramón Carrasco, the successor to Ferrín. After his fourth international on 15 August 2003, in which he led the Celeste as team captain to a 5–2 victory in the final of the LG Peace Cup against the Iraqi national team, Silva was not called up for a longer period. After a game against Turkey on 25 May 2008, he became a regular member of the national team again. He received his last call-up on 9 September 2009 in a 3–1 home win in the 2010 FIFA World Cup qualification against Colombia. He gained a total of 17 international caps in which he did not manage to score.

Career statistics

Honours

Club
Ajax
 Eredivisie: 2010–11, 2011–12
 KNVB Cup: 2009–10

Internacional
 Copa Libertadores: 2010

References

1980 births
Living people
People from Cerro Largo Department
Uruguayan footballers
Association football defenders
Danubio F.C. players
FC Rostov players
FC Groningen players
AFC Ajax players
Sport Club Internacional players
Cerro Largo F.C. players
Uruguayan Primera División players
Russian Premier League players
Eredivisie players
Campeonato Brasileiro Série A players
Uruguay international footballers
Uruguayan expatriate footballers
Uruguayan expatriate sportspeople in Russia
Uruguayan expatriate sportspeople in the Netherlands
Uruguayan expatriate sportspeople in Brazil
Expatriate footballers in Russia
Expatriate footballers in the Netherlands
Expatriate footballers in Brazil
Uruguayan Segunda División players